How Should I Be is a South Korean television series that was aired on SBS in 2001.

Crew  
 Teleplay: Jang Young-chul, Jeong Gyeong-sun
 Director: Jeong Se-ho

Characters 
 Kim Suk-hoon: The withdrawal
 Yoo Jun-sang: Byeongsu
  Kim Ji-ho: Unburned
 Kim Sa-rang: Eulsuk
 Youn Yuh-jung: Eomssi
 Park Geun-hyung: Taebong
 Im Ye-jin: User
 Han Chae-young: Hamish
 Kil Yong-woo: Dr. Tak
 Yang Jung-a: Line
 Choi Joonyong: Due south
 Yun Giwon: Acting
 Ryu Suyoung: Ashes
 Jang Hojun

2002 South Korean television series debuts